The Kolumba (previously Diözesanmuseum, "Diocesan Museum") is an art museum in Cologne, Germany. It is located on the site of the former St. Kolumba church, and run by the Archdiocese of Cologne.  It is one of the oldest museums in the city, alongside the Wallraf-Richartz Museum.

History

The museum was founded by the Society for Christian Art in 1853, and taken over by the Archdiocese of Cologne in 1989.

Until 2007 it was located near Cologne Cathedral. Its new home, built from 2003–07, was designed by Peter Zumthor and inaugurated by Joachim Meisner. The site was originally occupied by the romanesque Church of St. Kolumba, which was destroyed in World War II and replaced in 1950 by a Gottfried Böhm chapel nicknamed the "Madonna of the Ruins". 

The new structure Peter Zumthor built for the museum now shares its site with the ruins of the Gothic church and the 1950s chapel, wrapping a perforated grey brick facade like a cloak around both, the museum and old church. The sixteen exhibition rooms possess varying qualities with regard to incoming daylight, size, proportion, and pathways. The work on the project yielded the following reduction: light gray brick walls (Kolumba stones) and clay plaster, flooring made of Jura limestone, terrazzo, and mortar, ceilings made of a poured mortar shell, window frames, doors, casings and fittings of steel, wall paneling and furniture of wood, textiles and leather, curtains of leather and silk.

Collection

The collection includes paintings, drawings, prints, sculptures, decorative art and religious icons from Late Antiquity to the present.  Apart from a few works on permanent display, the presentation features a regularly changing selection of the museum's holdings.  The items are generally displayed without accompanying text, and in no particular chronological or stylistic order.

Highlights include:
The Hermann Ida Cross, an 11th-century processional cross made of gilded bronze.
A 12th-century ivory crucifix in romanesque Rhenish or Mosan style.
A collection of rosaries.
Stefan Lochner: Madonna with the Violet (pre-1450).
Paul Thek: Shrine (1969).
Jannis Kounellis: Tragedia civile (1975).
A large collection of works by Leiko Ikemura.

Awards
2008: Hanns-Schaefer Prize from the Cologne Home- and Landowners Association.
2008: Prize for Architecture in Germany from the German Architecture Museum in Frankfurt.
2008: Brick Award for contemporary European brick architecture from Wienerberger.
2008: Energy-Efficient Architecture in Germany Prize (third class) from the Wüstenrot Foundation.
2008: Praemium Imperiale (category: architecture) from the Japan Art Association, awarded to Zumthor.
2009: Museum Prize for Curators and Exhibition Hosts from the Kulturstiftung hbs.
2010: Cologne Architecture Prize from the Association of the Cologne Architecture Prize.
2011: Architecture Prize North Rhine-Westphalia from the Association of German Architects - Regional Association North Rhine-Westphalia (BDA-Landesverband NRW).

See also 
 List of museums in Cologne
 Franz Johann Joseph Bock - one of the founding fathers

References

External links
Home page in English

Art museums and galleries in Germany
Museums in Cologne
Buildings and structures in Cologne
Art museums established in 1853
1853 establishments in Prussia
1853 establishments in Germany